Lieutenant General Reginald Dawson Hopcraft Lough  (5 August 1885 – 22 March 1958) was a Royal Marines officer who served as the Commander of the Royal Marine Depot, Deal.  He was made aide-de-camp to King George VI.

Early life
Reginald Dawson Hopcraft Lough was born on 5 August 1885 in Halifax, Nova Scotia.  He was the son of William J. Lough, a retired Army chaplain, and Jane M. Lough.  He was educated at Bedford Modern School.

Career
Lough joined the Royal Marines in 1903. During the First World War he was mentioned in despatches five times, was awarded the Distinguished Service Order, appointed an Officer of the Order of the British Empire and decorated with the Croix de Guerre with palm.  He was promoted to lieutenant colonel  in 1933 and colonel in 1936. He became commander of the Royal Marine Depot, Deal in 1937. He was appointed Royal Marine ADC to King George VI  (1938–39) and promoted to major general in 1939 and to lieutenant general in 1940.  He retired in 1941.

Lough died in Deal, Kent on 22 March 1958.

References

External links
Memorial Window to Reginald Dawson Hopcraft Lough
Generals of World War II
Royal Marine Officers 1939−1945

1886 births
1958 deaths
Canadian military personnel from Nova Scotia
Companions of the Distinguished Service Order
Officers of the Order of the British Empire
People educated at Bedford Modern School
Recipients of the Croix de Guerre 1914–1918 (France)
Royal Marines generals of World War II
Royal Marines personnel of World War I
Royal Marines generals
People from Halifax, Nova Scotia
Canadian emigrants to the United Kingdom